Mehdi Benjelloun (born 10 November 1999), known by his stage name Petit Biscuit, is a French DJ and music producer.

The 23-year-old French producer has been making music with his distinctive style, forged through combining acoustic elements, electronic production, and his vocal manipulations. The eclecticism of this combination is reflective of his background in the polar spheres of electronica and classical music.  He has toured the world, including a performance at Coachella in 2018.

Early life
Mehdi was born to a Moroccan father and a French mother.

Mehdi learned to play instruments such as piano, cello, bass and guitar but preferred electro house sounds as he was able to produce "unlimited combinations of music". He wrote his first songs in secret in his room. His early musical interests and inspirations included electronica and classical music. Benjelloun was a regular high school student who balanced school work by day and music by night. The name "Petit Biscuit" is said to come from his love of French pastries his grandmother would make.

In July 2017, he graduated from high school, with a Baccalauréat Scientifique (high school diploma with a specialty in science) mention très bien (with honors). From September 2017, he started studying at Paris-Dauphine University and left the university to focus more on music in March 2018.

Career
He released his early works on SoundCloud until he got noticed by distributor Electro Posé, under whom he published "Sunset Lover" on 15 June 2015 as the lead single from his eponymous EP. It got over 62 million views and more than 400 million streams.

"You", "Palms", "Night Trouble", "Midnight Sky" and "Memories" were released as promotional singles on 15 June 2015. He released the single "Oceans" on 22 July 2015. He released his debut eponymous EP, Petit Biscuit on 13 May 2016.  Sunset Lover became an international breakthrough hit amassing over 350 million streams.

Petit Biscuit's debut album "Presence" was released in December 2017 and was described by Earmilk as a "powerful, momentous album".  It was Triple J Album of the week in Australia upon release and features artists Lido, Bipolar Sunshine, Cautious Clay and includes hits "Waterfall" and "Sunset Lover". He performed at the Victoires de la Musique, Paris – the French equivalent of the Brit Awards – and was nominated for his album, "Presence." To stay independent, he created his own label, "Petit Biscuit Music".

On 15 April 2018, he performed at Coachella for the first time. He has also toured multiple countries, including United States, United Kingdom, Netherlands, Mexico and Canada.

At the beginning of 2019, Petit Biscuit released "Wide Awake," which was described by Billboard as a "glitchy bass instrumental", and "We Were Young," featuring JP Cooper, as a "young love daydream".

On October 30, 2020, Petit Biscuit released his second studio album, "Parachute" via Écurie Records.

Musical style and influence
Petit Biscuit produces electronic music with a clean, melodic and atmospheric sound. He describes his music as a call to travel, deep human reflection, natural, and sensual things.

Discography

Albums

Compilations

Extended plays

Singles

As lead artist

Promotional singles

Other charted songs

Remixes

Awards and nominations

International Dance Music Awards

Berlin Music Video Awards 
Berlin Music Video Awards is an international festival founded in 2013 that puts the talents behind music videos into the spotlight. Supporting both unknown and famous artists, it is a primary networking event for the video and music industries in Europe. Filled with a vast selection of music video marathons, professional judges, live performances, filmmaking workshops and networking events, the festival is not only meeting ground for filmmakers, but also for musicians as well as all music enthusiasts.

References

1999 births
Living people
French DJs
French electronic musicians
Tropical house musicians
Musicians from Rouen
Electronic dance music DJs
French people of Moroccan descent